Zlatev, female form Zlateva is a Bulgarian surname. Notable people with the surname include:

Asen Zlatev (born 1960), Bulgarian weightlifter
Ivan Zlatev (born 1990), Bulgarian athlete
Pencho Zlatev (1881–1948), Bulgarian general
Spas Zlatev (born 1964), Bulgarian biathlete
Stoyan Zlatev (born 1954), Bulgarian modern pentathlete
Valentin Zlatev (born 1965), Bulgarian businessman
Stanka Zlateva (born 1983), Bulgarian freestyle wrestler
Svetla Zlateva (born 1952), Bulgarian sprinter

Bulgarian-language surnames